Tommaso Scotti, O.P. (died 22 May 1566) was a Roman Catholic prelate who served as Bishop of Terni (1566).

Biography
Tommaso Scotti was ordained a priest in the Order of Preachers.
On 6 March 1566, he was appointed by Pope Pius V as Bishop of Terni. 
He served as Bishop of Terni until his death on 22 May 1566.

References

External links and additional sources
 (for Chronology of Bishops) 
 (for Chronology of Bishops) 

16th-century Italian Roman Catholic bishops
1566 deaths
Bishops appointed by Pope Pius V
Dominican bishops